Belshazzar's feast, or the story of the writing on the wall (chapter 5 in the Book of Daniel), tells how Belshazzar holds a great feast and drinks from the vessels that had been looted in the destruction of the First Temple. A hand appears and writes on the wall. The terrified Belshazzar calls for his wise men, but they are unable to read the writing. The queen advises him to send for Daniel, renowned for his wisdom. Daniel reminds Belshazzar that his father Nebuchadnezzar, when he became arrogant, was thrown down until he learned that God has sovereignty over the kingdom of men (see Daniel 4). Belshazzar had likewise blasphemed God, and so God sent this hand.  Daniel then reads the message and interprets it: God has numbered Belshazzar's days, he has been weighed and found wanting, and his kingdom will be given to the Medes and the Persians.

The message of Daniel 5 is the contrast it offers between Nebuchadnezzar and Belshazzar:
 Nebuchadnezzar is humbled by God, learns his lesson (he acknowledges the ultimate kingship of the God of Israel), and is restored to his throne;
 Belshazzar, in contrast, learns nothing from Nebuchadnezzar's example, blasphemes against God, and his kingdom is given to others.

According to John J. Collins, Belshazzar's feast is a legend conforming to the subgenre of the "tale of court contest", complicated by the inclusion of Daniel's indictment of Belshazzar's pride and his failure to honour the God of Israel; as a result the tale has a double ending, in which Daniel is first showered with rewards and honours for interpreting the omen, and the king is then punished to fulfill the sentence pronounced by Daniel.

From the story the idiom "to be able to read the writing on the wall" came to mean being able to see from available evidence that doom or failure is inevitable, and "the writing on the wall" itself can mean anything portending such doom or failure.

Summary

Narrative summary
This section summarizes the narrative, as found in C. L. Seow's translation of the text in his commentary on Daniel.

King Belshazzar holds a great feast for a thousand of his lords, and commands that the Temple vessels from Jerusalem be brought in so that they can drink from them, but as the Babylonians drink, a hand appears and writes on the wall. Belshazzar calls for his magicians and diviners to interpret the writing, but they are unable even to read it. The queen advises Belshazzar to send for Daniel, renowned for his wisdom. Daniel is brought in, and the king offers to make him third in rank in the kingdom if he can interpret the writing. Daniel declines the honour, but agrees to the request. He reminds Belshazzar that his father Nebuchadnezzar's greatness was the gift of God, and that when he became arrogant God threw him down until he learned humility: "the Most High God has sovereignty over the kingdom of mortals, and sets over it whomever He will." Belshazzar has drunk from the vessels of God's Temple and praised his idols, but he has not given honour to God, and so God sent this hand and wrote these words:

Daniel reads the words "MENE, MENE, TEKEL, UPHARSIN" and interprets them for the king: "MENE, God has numbered the days of your kingdom and brought it to an end; TEKEL, you have been weighed ... and found wanting;" and "UPHARSIN", your kingdom is divided and given to the Medes and Persians. Then Belshazzar gave the command, and Daniel was clothed in purple, a chain of gold was put around his neck, and a proclamation was made… that he should rank third in the kingdom; [and] that very night Belshazzar the Chaldean (Babylonian) king was killed, and Darius the Mede received the kingdom."

Writing on the wall

None of the Chaldean wise men are able to even read, let alone interpret, the writing on the wall, but Daniel does so by supplying vowels in two different ways, first so the words are read as nouns, then as verbs. The nouns are monetary weights: a mənê, equivalent to a Jewish mina or sixty shekels (several ancient versions have only one mənê instead of two); a təqêl, equivalent to a shekel; and p̄arsîn, meaning "half-pieces". The last involves a word-play on the name of the Persians (pārās in Hebrew), suggesting not only that they are to inherit Belshazzar's kingdom, but that they are two peoples, Medes and Persians. Daniel then interprets the words as verbs, based on their roots: mənê is interpreted as meaning "numbered"; təqêl, from a root meaning to weigh, as meaning "weighed" (and found wanting); and pərês, the singular form of p̄arsîn, from a root meaning "to divide", denoting that the kingdom is to be "divided" and given to the Medes and Persians. If the "half-pieces" means two half-shekels, then the various weights—a mənê or sixty shekels, another shekel, and two half-shekels—add up to 62, which the tale gives as the age of Darius the Mede, indicating that God's will is being worked out.

The phrase "the writing on the wall" has grown to be a popular idiomatic expression referring to the foreshadowing of any impending doom, misfortune, or end. A person who does not or refuses to "see the writing on the wall" is being described as ignorant to the signs of a cataclysmic event that will likely occur in the near future.

One of the earliest known uses of the phrase in English was by a Captain L. Brinckmair in 1638, whose report "The Warnings of Germany" during the Thirty Years' War cautioned that the violence there could soon spill over to England. "The writing on the wall" is also sometimes  referred to by the use of some combination of the words "Mene, Mene, Tekel, Upharsin", as they were written on the wall in the tale of Belshazzar's feast. The metaphor has consistently made appearances in various works of literature and media as a foreshadowing device ever since Brinckmair's report.

Reference to this event also led to the use of "Belshazzar" as a brand name for an overhead projector during that device's heyday in the second half of the twentieth century.

Composition and structure

It is generally accepted that the Book of Daniel originated as a collection of folktales among the Jewish community in Babylon in the Persian and early Hellenistic periods (5th to 3rd centuries BC), and was later expanded in the Maccabean era (mid-2nd century) with the visions of chapters 7–12.  Modern scholarship agrees that Daniel is a legendary figure, and it is possible that his name was chosen for the hero of the book because of his reputation as a wise seer in Hebrew tradition.

Chapters 2–7 of the book form a chiasm (a poetic structure in which the main point or message of a passage is placed in the centre and framed by further repetitions on either side):
 A. (chapter 2) – A dream of four kingdoms replaced by a fifth
 B. (chapter 3) – Daniel's three friends in the fiery furnace
 C. (chapter 4) – Daniel interprets a dream for Nebuchadnezzar
 C'. (chapter 5) – Daniel interprets the handwriting on the wall for Belshazzar
 B'. (chapter 6) – Daniel in the lions' den
 A'. (chapter 7) – A vision of four world kingdoms replaced by a fifth

Daniel 5 is thus composed as a companion-piece to Daniel 4, the tale of the madness of Nebuchadnezzar, the two giving variations on a single theme. This is spelled out in chapter 5 when Daniel draws a direct parallel between the two kings: the fate of Belshazzar illustrates what happens when a king does not repent.

Daniel 5 does not divide neatly into scenes and scholars do not agree on its structure. The following is one possible outline:
 The king's banquet and the mysterious oracle: the king desecrates the sacred vessels, the hand writes on the wall (verses 1–6)
 Attempts to interpret the oracle: the Chaldean sages fail, the queen recommends Daniel (verses 7–12)
 Daniel appears before Belshazzar: Daniel addresses and rebukes the king, interprets the oracle, and is rewarded (verses 13–29)
 Conclusion: Belshazzar's death, Darius' accession (verses 30–31)

Historical background
The story is set around the fall of Babylon, when on 12 October 539 BCE the Persian conqueror Cyrus the Great entered the city. Its last king, Nabonidus, was captured; his fate is unknown, although he may have been exiled. Several details in the text do not match the known historical facts. Belshazzar is portrayed as king of Babylon and son of Nebuchadnezzar, but was actually the son of King Nabonidus, one of Nebuchadnezzar's successors, who deputised for Nabonidus when the latter was away in Teima, but never became king. The conqueror is named as Darius the Mede, but no such individual is known to history; and the invaders were not Medes, but Persians. John J. Collins suggests this is typical of the story's genre, in which historical accuracy is not an essential element.

The constituent elements of the Book of Daniel were assembled shortly after the end of the Maccabean crisis, which is to say shortly after 164 BCE. The tales making up chapters 2 to 6 are the earliest part, dating from the late 4th or early 3rd centuries. Their setting is Babylon, and there is no reason to doubt that they were composed in the Babylonian diaspora (i.e., among the Jewish community living in Babylon and Mesopotamia under Persian and then Greek rule). They reflect a society in which foreign rulers were not necessarily malevolent (Belshazzar rewards Daniel and raises him to high office); this is a marked contrast with the visions of chapters 7–12, where the sufferings of the Jews are the result of actions by the evil 2nd century BCE king Antiochus IV Epiphanes.

Chapters 2 and 7 tell how all worldly kingdoms will come to an end and be replaced by the kingdom of God, and chapters 3 and 6 tell how pious Jews withstand the arrogance of earthly kings and are rescued by the God of Israel. Chapters 4 and 5 form the center and carry the most important message in their parallel but contrasting tales of Nebuchadnezzar and Belshazzar (verses ). The first is humbled by God, learns his lesson (he acknowledges the ultimate kingship of the Jewish God), and is restored to his throne; Belshazzar, in contrast, learns nothing from Nebuchadnezzar's example, blasphemes against God, and has his kingdom given to others.

Belshazzar's feast in pop culture 
Johnny Cash's first recorded Gospel song was "Belshazzar," a direct retelling of the Biblical story from the Book of Daniel. He recorded the song in 1957 and was the only Gospel song that Sun Records allowed Cash to record and release with the label.

In Iron Maiden's title track called "The Writing on The Wall" that was released in 2021, the feast is referenced in the music video where you can see a piece of paper stating Belshazzar's feast which everyone seem to be heading to. Inside is a musical feast, and a being that is draining life force out of others. Eddie ends this feast and leaves the feast together with the four horsemen and the remaining two persons that was previously drained by the being.

See also
 Babylon
 Cultural depictions of Belshazzar
 Fall of Babylon

References

Citations

Sources 

 

 
 

 
 
 
 

Belshazzar
Book of Daniel chapters
Jewish Babylonian history
Hebrew Bible words and phrases
Aramaic words and phrases
Darius the Mede
Legends